Václav Nedomanský (born 14 March 1944) is a Czech former ice hockey forward. Nedomanský is best known as the first Czech hockey player to defect to North America to play. He was inducted into the Hockey Hall of Fame in 2019. He is also a member of the International Ice Hockey Federation Hall of Fame (1997), Slovak Hockey Hall of Fame (2002), Czech Ice Hockey Hall of Fame (2008) and was named into the  IIHF All-Time Czech Team (2020).

Playing in Czechoslovakia
Nedomanský played for Slovan Bratislava of the Czechoslovak Extraliga for twelve seasons. In 1968, he was a member of the Czechoslovak national ice hockey team which won silver medals at the Winter Olympics in Grenoble and bronze medals in 1972 at the Winter Olympics in Sapporo.  He also played for Czechoslovakia in nine IIHF World Championships, and was named top forward at the 1974 World Championships.

Career after defection
Nedomanský defected in 1974 to Toronto via Switzerland. He was not able to return to his home country until after the fall of the Iron Curtain.

He played just over three seasons in the World Hockey Association with the Toronto Toros and the Birmingham Bulls, peaking with 56 goals and 98 points for Toronto in 1975–76.  He also won the Paul Deneau Trophy for sportsmanship in 1975–76.  He then signed as a free agent with the National Hockey League's Detroit Red Wings in 1977.  Nedomanský played five seasons for Detroit, posting highs of 38 goals and 74 points.  He retired after one final season with the St. Louis Blues and the New York Rangers in 1982–83.

Nedomanský coached in Germany and Austria from 1987 to 1991.

He was born in Hodonin, in eastern Moravia in the present-day Czech Republic.

Career statistics

Regular season and playoffs

International

References

External links
 
 Cold War Conversations - Czechoslovak hockey star defects to Canada (132) An interview with Václav's son Vashi Nedomanský, who talks about his father's defection from Czechoslovakia to Canada.

1944 births
Birmingham Bulls players
Czechoslovak expatriate sportspeople in Canada
Czechoslovak expatriate sportspeople in Austria
Czechoslovak expatriate sportspeople in the United States
Czech ice hockey centres
Czechoslovak defectors
Czechoslovak emigrants to Canada
Detroit Red Wings players
SHK Hodonín players
HC Slovan Bratislava players
Hockey Hall of Fame inductees
Ice hockey players at the 1968 Winter Olympics
Ice hockey players at the 1972 Winter Olympics
IIHF Hall of Fame inductees
Living people
Los Angeles Kings scouts
Medalists at the 1968 Winter Olympics
Medalists at the 1972 Winter Olympics
Nashville Predators scouts
New York Rangers players
Olympic bronze medalists for Czechoslovakia
Olympic ice hockey players of Czechoslovakia
Olympic medalists in ice hockey
Olympic silver medalists for Czechoslovakia
People from Hodonín
Phoenix Roadrunners (IHL) players
St. Louis Blues players
Toronto Toros players
Vegas Golden Knights scouts
Recipients of Medal of Merit (Czech Republic)
Sportspeople from the South Moravian Region
Czechoslovak expatriate sportspeople in West Germany
Los Angeles Kings personnel
Czechoslovak expatriate ice hockey people